Richard Fletcher (by 1523 – 1559/1560), of Rye, Sussex, was an English politician.

He was a Member (MP) of the Parliament of England for Rye in March 1553, April 1554 and 1559.

References

16th-century deaths
People from Rye, East Sussex
English MPs 1553 (Edward VI)
Year of birth uncertain
English MPs 1554
English MPs 1559